Rangoon riots may refer to:

1930 Rangoon riots, race riots between Indian dockworkers and Burman labourers in that began May, 1930, in the city of Rangoon
1931 Rangoon riots, anti-Chinese riots led by Burmese mobs erupted in Rangoon's Chinatown
1938 Rangoon riots, anti-Muslim riots that began in July, 1938, in the Rangoon
1962 Rangoon University protests, a series of demonstrations against campus regulations and the policy of the new military regime of General Ne Win
1967 Rangoon riots, anti-Chinese riots occurred in Rangoon following the agitation spread by a few Red Guards in the regional context linked to China's Cultural Revolution